Wilsher v Essex Area Health Authority [1988] AC 1074 is an English tort law case concerning the "material increase of risk" test for causation.

Facts
The defendant hospital, initially acting through an inexperienced junior doctor, negligently administered excessive oxygen during the post-natal care of a premature child who subsequently became blind. Excessive oxygen was, according to the medical evidence, one of five possible factors that could have led to blindness. On the "balance of probabilities" test, the hospital would not be liable, since it was more likely that one of the alternate risks had caused the injury. The Court of Appeal applied the "material increase of risk" test, first espoused in McGhee v National Coal Board. The Court found that since the hospital breached its duty and thus increased the risk of harm, and that the plaintiff's injury fell within the ambit of that risk, the hospital was liable despite the fact the plaintiff had not proved the hospital's negligence had caused his injury.

Judgment
The House of Lords found that it was impossible to say that the defendant's negligence had caused, or materially contributed, to the injury and the claim was dismissed. It also stated that McGhee articulated no new rule of law, but was rather based upon a robust inference of fact (this understanding of McGhee was rejected in Fairchild v Glenhaven Funeral Services Ltd).

In a minority view, Mustill LJ. argued that if it is established that conduct of a certain kind materially adds to the risk of injury, if the defendant engages in such conduct in breach of a common law duty, and if the injury is the kind to which the conduct related, then the defendant is taken to have caused the injury even though the existence and extent of the contribution made by the breach cannot be ascertained.

See also
Negligence
Causation in English law

English tort case law
English causation case law
House of Lords cases
1988 in case law
1988 in British law
1980s in Essex